Events in the year 1868 in Portugal.

Incumbents
Monarch: Louis I
Prime Ministers: Joaquim António de Aguiar; António José de Ávila, 1st Duke of Ávila and Bolama; Bernardo de Sá Nogueira de Figueiredo, 1st Marquis of Sá da Bandeira

Events
 22 March and 12 April - Legislative election.
Janeirinha (protest movement)

Arts and entertainment

Sports

Births

7 April – José de Castro, lawyer, journalist and politician (died 1929)
9 December – Manuel António Gomes, Catholic priest, inventor and physicist, a pioneer of solar energy in Portugal (d. 1933)

Deaths

References

 
1860s in Portugal
Portugal
Years of the 19th century in Portugal
Portugal